Kuno Wittmer (born 6 September 1982) is a Canadian racing driver who currently competes in the Michelin Pilot Challenge.

Career
In 2014, Wittmer won the United SportsCar Championship GTLM class. Prior to the 2020 Michelin Pilot Challenge season, Wittmer joined AWA Racing's McLaren entry in the Grand Sport class. Wittmer took pole in his first race with AWA, with a half-second advantage over Tyler McQuarrie in second.

Racing record

Complete American Le Mans Series results
(key) (Races in bold indicate pole position)

Complete Grand-Am Rolex Sports Car Series results
(key) (Races in bold indicate pole position)

Complete WeatherTech SportsCar Championship results
(key) (Races in bold indicate pole position)

Complete Bathurst 12 Hours results

Complete 24 Hours of Le Mans results

References

External links
Kuno Wittmer at Motorsport.com

1982 births
Living people
Canadian racing drivers
24 Hours of Daytona drivers
24 Hours of Le Mans drivers
WeatherTech SportsCar Championship drivers
BMW M drivers
Rahal Letterman Lanigan Racing drivers
Nürburgring 24 Hours drivers
Michelin Pilot Challenge drivers